Barack Obama, the 44th President of the United States, has successfully run for president twice:

 Barack Obama 2008 presidential campaign
 Barack Obama 2012 presidential campaign

See also
 Barack Obama 2008 presidential primary campaign